Calvin David Mitchell (born March 8, 1999) is an American professional baseball outfielder for the Pittsburgh Pirates of Major League Baseball (MLB). He made his MLB debut in 2022.

Amateur career
Mitchell graduated from Rancho Bernardo High School in San Diego, California, where he played four years of varsity baseball. As a junior in 2016, he batted .371 with 12 home runs and 41 RBIs. In 2017, as a senior, he batted .369 with 11 home runs and 34 RBIs. For his high school career, he batted .337 with 29 home runs and 120 RBIs. Mitchell committed to the University of San Diego to play college baseball for the San Diego Toreros baseball team. However, the Pittsburgh Pirates selected him in the second round (50th overall) of the 2017 Major League Baseball draft and he signed for a $1.4 million signing bonus, forgoing his commitment to USD.

Professional career
After signing, Mitchell made his professional debut with the Rookie-level Gulf Coast League Pirates. He spent the all of his first professional season there, batting .245 with two home runs and 20 RBIs in 43 games. He spent 2018 with the West Virginia Power of the Class A South Atlantic League. He was named the SAL Player of the Week for April 16–22 after hitting .467 with one home run, nine RBIs, and a 1.233 OPS, and also earned All-Star honors. Over 119 games for the Power, he hit .280 with ten home runs and 65 RBIs. He spent 2019 with the Bradenton Marauders of the Class A-Advanced Florida State League, with whom he was named an All-Star. Over 118 games, he slashed .251/.304/.406 with 15 home runs and 64 RBIs. He did not play a minor league game in 2020 since the season was cancelled due to the COVID-19 pandemic. Mitchell was assigned to the Altoona Curve of the Double-A Northeast for a majority of the 2021 season, slashing .280/.330/.429 with 12 home runs, 61 RBIs, and 19 doubles over 108 games. Following the end of Altoona's season in mid-September, he was promoted to the Indianapolis Indians of the Triple-A East with whom he played seven games. He returned to the Indians to begin the 2022 season.

On May 24, 2022, the Pirates selected Mitchell's contract and promoted him to the major leagues. He made his MLB debut that night as their starting right fielder, going one-for-four and recording his first MLB hit and RBI with a single off of Kyle Freeland in a 2-1 loss to the Colorado Rockies at PNC Park. He hit his first MLB home run on June 5, 2022 in a game against the Arizona Diamondbacks. After Miles Mikolas of the St. Louis Cardinals had pitched  no-hit innings in a game against the Pirates on June 14, 2022, Cal Mitchell hit a ground rule double with two strikes in the count to break up the no-hitter.

References

External links

1999 births
Living people
African-American baseball players
Baseball players from San Diego
Major League Baseball outfielders
Pittsburgh Pirates players
Gulf Coast Pirates players
West Virginia Power players
Bradenton Marauders players
Altoona Curve players
Indianapolis Indians players
Rancho Bernardo High School alumni